Brian Maienschein (born May 22, 1969) is an American attorney and politician currently serving in the California State Assembly, representing the 77th district, encompassing parts of northeastern San Diego since 2012. Prior to serving in the state assembly, he was a member of the San Diego City Council, and the city's first Commissioner on Homelessness. He is most known for his response to two wildfires in his district, the 2003 Cedar Fire and the 2007 Witch Creek Fire, as well as for the completion of California State Route 56 and the preservation from development of 10,000 acres in the San Pasqual Valley.

Early life and education
Maienschein graduated from the University of California, Santa Barbara in 1991 with a bachelor of arts degree in communications. He returned to San Diego to attend California Western School of Law. He clerked for Judge Norbert Ehrenfreud focusing on the mental health calendar in San Diego. Maienschein also teaches a course on Election Law at USD School of Law.

Early career 
After passing the bar, Maienschein worked as a business attorney in private practice and became actively engaged with the community. Maienschein helped develop San Diego's Community Youth Court, bringing together community service agencies, schools, and law enforcement to provide intervention and help first-time juvenile offenders. Maienschein served as the Community Youth Court's Executive Director and received the District Attorney's Crime Victims' Rights Award in 1999. The program has since been transitioned into the San Diego Youth Commission. This program is made up of appointees aged 14 to 22 who meet to confer on issues relating to youth in San Diego County, and report their findings and recommendations to the Mayor.

At age 29, Maienschein decided to run for San Diego City Council. In preparation for his campaign, Maienschein walked each precinct of District 5 twice, knocking on doors and engaging with constituents.

San Diego City Council
Maienschein was elected to the San Diego City Council in November 2000 with 63% of the vote, the most ever received by a non-incumbent, and was re-elected without opposition in 2004.

During his two terms on the City Council, Brian secured the opening of State Route 56 and led numerous infrastructure improvements throughout the City of San Diego. He also preserved over 11,000 acres in the San Pasqual Valley from development.

In 2003 and 2007, wildfires swept through the district, devastating homes and businesses. Maienschein walked the burned-out neighborhood streets himself before constituents were allowed to return, developing a list of homes and businesses that had been destroyed. In response to the fires, Maienschein created a one-stop disaster hub for victims to support and streamline rebuilding efforts, bringing together the all the government agencies and services for those impacted by fires. The plan and programs Maienschein created are still national models for disaster response.

Homelessness Commissioner 
On January 5, 2009, the United Way appointed Maienschein as San Diego's first "Commissioner of the Plan to End Chronic Homelessness" (also called the Homelessness Commissioner). In that role, Maienschein created Project 25, an innovative pilot program for people experiencing homelessness coupling permanent housing with intensive individualized support, including a medical home. The program's mission was to show how housing and medical care, when delivered in concert, could improve health and housing outcomes for people who are vulnerable while also reducing costs.

Leading both the fundraising and coordination efforts, Maienschein worked with more than 20 organizations including the United Way, St. Vincent de Paul, the San Diego Housing Commission, the County of San Diego, the City of San Diego, and area hospitals, among others.

Project 25 launched in 2011, serving 35 individuals experiencing homelessness who had been identified as the most frequent users of public services, including emergency rooms, hospitals, jails, and ambulances. Before the end of the program's first year, all 35 individuals in the program were housed in their own apartments and were receiving comprehensive wrap-around services.

A 2015 study by the Fermanian Business & Economic Institute at Point Loma Nazarene University summarized the outcomes of the program. "The results are impressive … In addition to significant decreases in public costs and service utilization, Project 25 also helped people become more independent, including helping them secure their own income."

Two years after the conclusion of the pilot in 2015, all Project 25 participants were still participating in the program and were housed in their own apartments, had acquired health care insurance, and were receiving health care on an ongoing basis.

California State Assembly
In 2011, Maienschein announced he would run for the 77th District seat in the California State Assembly. He was elected on November 6, 2012, with more than 60% of the vote, and was sworn in on December 3, 2012. Maienschein served as Vice Chair of both the Health and Human Services Committees. In addition, Maienschein served on the Housing, Judiciary, and Business, Professions and Consumer Protection Committees.

Maienschein was reelected in 2014, winning more than 65% in the primary election and then 70% of the vote in the general election on November 4, 2014. In 2015, Maienschein was named the Chair of the Assembly Local Government Committee – the only Republican appointed to lead a committee in the California legislature.  In addition to chairing the Local Government Committee, Maienschein served again as vice-chair of the Health and Human Services Committees, as well as serving on the Housing, Judiciary and Business, Professions and Consumer Protection Committees. At the conclusion of the term, Maienschein had 25 bills signed into law – the most bills amongst the San Diego delegation.

In 2016, Maienschein was re-elected to his third term in the California State Assembly. During the two-year term, Maienschein served as vice-chair of the Health Committee and served on the Housing and Community Development, Judiciary, and Government Organization Committees. This year, Maienschein was the lead Republican negotiator in renewing the Managed Care Organization (MCO) tax, which helped save Medi-Cal.

Maienschein was re-elected on November 6, 2018 by 607 votes. On January 24, 2019, Maienschein announced he switched his political party affiliation to the Democratic party. Maienschein penned an op-ed in the San Diego Union-Tribune explaining the switch.

Maienschein was reelected to the California State Assembly on November 3, 2020. He currently serves on the Communications and Conveyance, Health, Judiciary, and Rules Committees.

Maienschein has been a champion for mental health, has had more animal rights and protection bills signed than any other legislator, and has prioritized the public safety of the communities he represents. In addition, his focus remains on environmental safety, military and veteran benefits, protections for the elderly, and enhancing the judiciary system in California.

Legislation 
Maienschein has been a strong advocate for child safety laws. In 2014, Maienschein passed AB 230, which requires youth sport leagues to disclose their background check policies to parents and whether or not they include federal and state level criminal histories.

Assembly District 77 has a large Navy population, and Maienschein has made it a priority to advocate for the families of active and retired service-members. In 2013, Maienschein introduced AB 186, which made it easier for military spouses to obtain a temporary professional or vocational license, allowing them to find work and support their families while stationed in California.

In 2018, Maienschein's AB 2193 was signed into law, requiring obstetric providers including OB/GYNs, family practice providers and nurse practitioners either confirm screening has occurred or screen for maternal mental health disorders at least once during the perinatal period. AB 2193 also requires health plans and health insurers to create programs to address these maternal mental health disorders.

Also in 2018, Maienschein took action to expand protections against human trafficking. AB 2105 allows courts to triple any fine, add a civil penalty, or damage award regarding the purchase of sex from a minor.

Maienschein addressed California's housing crisis in 2019 by authoring AB 960. This bill allows CalWORKS recipients to use housing assistance vouchers on a shared housing setting, such as staying with family and friends, rather than solely at motels and hotels.

In 2019, the community of Poway was devastated by the Chabad of Poway synagogue shooting, which injured 3 and killed 1. Maienschein responded to this tragedy by authoring AB 1548. This bill established a grant program for nonprofits at high risk of terrorist attacks to access funding for security.

In 2020, Maienschein authored AB 856, which helps active military service-members and their families have access to a broader range of community college courses offered on military bases by waiving open course provisions.

In the fall of 2021, the community of Rancho Bernardo was proposed as the placement for a sexually violent predator (SVP). In joining the community in opposition to the placement, Maienschein found various flaws in the law regarding where an SVP can be placed. In response to this, Maienschein introduced AB 1641 in 2022, which would place restrictions on where an SVP can be housed in a community. However, the bill was heavily amended before passage, and the final version only required GPS monitoring of sexually violent predators until they are legally discharged. 

As of 2021, Maienschein has authored 107 bills into law.

Awards 
Maienschein has received numerous awards for his career in public service.

Health and Mental Health 
Maienschein was named the March of Dimes California Legislative Champion for his work to improve maternal mental health care in California.

Maienschein was recognized as a Reproductive Health Care Champion by Planned Parenthood for his 100% voting record in support of reproductive freedoms and a woman's right to choose.

As Co-chair of the Rare Disease California Caucus, Maienschein is a strong advocate for the rare disease community. He received the Rare Voice Award from Rare Disease Legislative Advocates for his continued dedication to the awareness and treatment of rare diseases.

Maienschein was recognized as the California Ambulance Association EMS Champion for his outstanding dedication to EMS delivery.

Housing 
Maienschein has been recognized for his work to ensure affordable housing is available in California. He has been awarded the Housing Package Award from Habitat for Humanity, and was recognized as an Outstanding Government Elected Official by the San Diego Housing Federation.

The California Housing Consortium recognized Maienschein in their California Housing Hall of Fame - Public Sector for his contribution in fostering the creation of affordable housing throughout California.

Animals 
San Diego Humane Society named Maienschein their Humane Hero Compassion for championing animal rights. Maienschein has partnered with San Diego Humane Society for nearly 10 years, hosting annual pet adoptions to emphasize the importance of adopting, not shopping for animals.

Maienschein was honored as the Legislator of the Year by PawPAC for his dedication to protecting animals from abuse, neglect and exploitation.

Maienschein was also awarded with Scooter Pal's Justice for Animal Award for his work on legislation that gives dogs seized in criminal dog fighting rings a second chance at life.

Children, Families, and the Elderly 
The Center for Judicial Excellence recognized Maienschein with their Champion of Children's Rights Award for his work in ensuring that children aged 10–14 can speak directly to a family judge.

Maienschein was honored with the Live United Award by United Way of California for his exceptional service to California children and families.

Maienschein was awarded the Distinguished Legislative Service Medal by Hazel's Army for his work to increase penalties for incidents that result in death or serious physical injury at a residential care facility for the elderly.

The Children's Advocacy Institute recognized Maienschein as the Outstanding Legislator Award for his work on ensuring care facilities are employed by individuals without outstanding convictions or criminal background investigations.

Intellectual and Developmental Disabilities 
Maienschein has also received the Easter Seals California Assembly Champion Award and the Assembly Advocate Award for his work in passing legislation to improve employment opportunities and strengthening sexual assault protections for the disabled and special needs community.

Employment & Community Options awarded Maienschein the Legislator of the Year Award for his work on behalf of those with disabilities and his work to increase pay rates for supported employment services.

The Arc of San Diego and United Cerebral Palsy honored Maienschein with their Leadership for Change Award for his continued dedication to individuals with developmental disabilities and their families.

Business and Technology 
Maienschein received the Legislative Excellence Award from the Professional Fiduciary Association of California for his work on ensuring financial transparency when individuals hire a professional fiduciary to petition a conservator or temporary conservator.

Maienschein was named Legislator of the Year by the California Small Business Association for his continued support of small businesses.

The Conference of California Bar Association named Maienschein their Legislator of the Year for his contribution to the Conference.

TechAmerica recognized Maienschein for his support and promotion of San Diego's technology industry.

Climate and Environment 
Maienschein received an A rating from the Sierra Club for his environmentally-friendly voting record in the Assembly.

Personal life 

 
Maienschein lives in San Diego with his wife, Elly, and daughters, Taylin and Brenna. He also teaches election law at the University of San Diego School of Law.

2014 California State Assembly

2016 California State Assembly

2018 California State Assembly

2020 California State Assembly

See also
San Diego City Council elections, 2004

References

External links 
 
 Campaign website
 Join California Brian Maienschein

Members of the California State Assembly
San Diego City Council members
Living people
1969 births
Politicians from Independence, Missouri
California Republicans
California Democrats
University of California, Santa Barbara alumni
California Western School of Law alumni
21st-century American politicians